Alessandro Mattei (20 February 1744, Rome – 20 April 1820) was an Italian Cardinal, and a significant figure in papal diplomacy of the Napoleonic period. He was from the Roman aristocratic House of Mattei.

He became Archbishop of Ferrara in 1777, and was named cardinal in 1779.

He became Bishop of Palestrina in 1800, Bishop of Porto-Santa Rufina in 1809, and Bishop of Ostia in 1814. From 1817 to his death he was archpriest of St Peter's Basilica.

Episcopal succession

Cardinal Bernardino Giraud consecrated Mattei to the episcopacy on 23 February 1777. Having himself consecrated Pietro Francesco Galleffi to the episcopacy, Cardinal Mattei is in the episcopal lineage of Pope Francis.

Notes

External links
Biography

 
 

1744 births
1820 deaths
A
19th-century Italian cardinals
Roman Catholic archbishops in Italy
Bishops of Ferrara
Clergy from Rome
Cardinal-bishops of Ostia
Cardinal-bishops of Palestrina
Cardinal-bishops of Porto
Deans of the College of Cardinals
Papal chamberlains
18th-century Italian cardinals
18th-century Italian Roman Catholic archbishops